is a former Japanese politician of the Liberal Democratic Party, a former member of the House of Representatives in the Diet (national legislature).

Career
Sugawara is a native of Nerima, Tokyo, and a graduate of Waseda University. After an unsuccessful contest in 1990, he was elected to the assembly of Nerima, Tokyo, for the first time in 1991 serving for two terms. Having served in the prefectural assembly of Tokyo since 1997, he ran unsuccessfully for the House of Representatives in 2000. He ran again three years later and was elected for the first time in Tokyo 9th district.

His profile on the LPD website:
Tokyo Metropolitan Assembly Member
Parliamentary Secretary for Health, Labour and Welfare (Abe Cabinet)
Deputy Secretary-General of LDP
Deputy Director, Health, Labor and Welfare Division of LDP
Director, Economy, Trade and Industry Division of LDP
Senior Vice Minister of Economy, Trade and Industry

Positions
Affiliated to the openly revisionist and monarchist lobby Nippon Kaigi, Sugawara supports the amendment of the Constitution of Japan, and a revision of the Constitution to allow the right of collective self-defense. He is opposed to the project that would allow women in the Imperial family to retain their Imperial status even after marriage, and to the plan to end all nuclear power plants by the end of the 2030s.

References

External links 
 Official website  in Japanese.

|-

 
|-

 
|-

Living people
1962 births
Members of Nippon Kaigi
Liberal Democratic Party (Japan) politicians
Members of the House of Representatives (Japan)
21st-century Japanese politicians
Government ministers of Japan
Members of the House of Representatives from Tokyo